Thomas Grigg may refer to:
 Thomas Grigg (politician)
 Thomas Grigg (musician)